Sumi Hwang (born 25 January 1986) is a South Korean soprano.

Early life and education
Hwang was born in Yecheon, South Korea. She studied at the Seoul National University where she received both her bachelor's and master's degrees in music. In 2011 she moved to Europe and completed the postgraduate course at the Hochschule für Musik und Theater München.

Career
Her singing talent was recognized in a church choir and she was encouraged to take singing lessons.
In 2012, Hwang won second prize in the ARD International Music Competition in Munich, Germany.
That year, Hwang also was award first prize at the Grandi Voci in Salzburg. In 2013, she also received first prize at the Anneliese Rothenberger Competition.

In May 2014, Sumi Hwang won the first prize in the Queen Elisabeth Competition in Belgium. Later that year, she made her United States debut at the Phillips Collection.

She joined the ensemble of Theater Bonn since September 2014.

She performed the Olympic Hymn, singing in Greek, at the opening ceremony of the 2018 Winter Olympics in Pyeongchang

References

External links 
 Official website

1986 births
Living people
People from Yecheon County
Seoul Arts High School alumni
Seoul National University alumni
University of Music and Performing Arts Munich alumni
Prize-winners of the Queen Elisabeth Competition
South Korean operatic sopranos
21st-century South Korean women singers
21st-century women opera singers